Joanna Tomera (born 4 August 1999) is a French tennis player.

Tomera made her WTA main draw debut at the 2018 Internationaux de Strasbourg in the doubles draw partnering Wallis Vitis.

External links

1999 births
Living people
French female tennis players